Andrew Barron (born May 2, 1951 in Penrith, Cumberland, England) is a former ice speed skater, who represented Canada in two consecutive Winter Olympics, starting in 1972 in Sapporo, Japan. Barron is a resident of Canmore, Alberta.

References
 SkateResults
 Canadian Olympic Committee

External links
 

1951 births
Living people
People from Penrith, Cumbria
Sportspeople from Cumbria
Canadian male speed skaters
English emigrants to Canada
Olympic speed skaters of Canada
Speed skaters from Calgary
Speed skaters at the 1972 Winter Olympics
Speed skaters at the 1976 Winter Olympics